Napoleons is a town in Victoria, Australia in the Golden Plains Shire local government area,  west of the state capital, Melbourne.

The Post Office opened on 1 September 1862, was known as Napoleon until around 1950, and closed in 1971.  A Community Postal Agency opened at the Napoleons store on 17 April 2012.

The town is served by Napoleons Primary School, with an enrolment of 102. The current school opened in 2002. The original school, situated nearby, opened in 1870.

References

Towns in Victoria (Australia)
Golden Plains Shire